Marguerite Bervoets, born in La Louvière, (6 March 1914 - 7 August 1944) was a Belgian resistance fighter during World War II.

Biography
Marguerite was a graduate in philosophy and literature, and a poet. At the time of the German invasion of Belgium she was working as a teacher in Tournai. After the fall of Belgium to Nazi Germany, Marguerite published in the press, "La Deliverance". It was a resistance movement for resistance members to rise during the occupation and would transfer intelligence to the Allied Powers.

On 8 August 1942 Marguerite and another resistance member, Cécile Detournay, went to the edge of Chièvres Airfield for the purpose of photographing newly installed anti-aircraft guns. They were both carrying a shopping bag and a camera, once they reached the edge of the airfield they began to take pictures. A few minutes later a German sentry caught them by surprise and escorted them both to an officer nearby. They both showed their shopping bags and claimed that they were going to a nearby farm to get some food and take pictures of the fields. Unfortunately the German lieutenant ordered an investigation. A woman, a prosecution witness, provided evidence that led to the indictment of Marguerite Bervoets and the leaders of the group to which she belonged. At Marguerite's house they discovered weapons. She sensed her fate, and in high school she would often quote Maeterlinck, saying; "It is beautiful to when one sacrifices oneself, that sacrifice brings happiness to other men".

After a few months of incarceration in Mons, Marguerite and Detournay were deported to Germany for their fates to be decided by the Volksgericht of Leer. Marguerite was sentenced to death and Detournay to 8 years forced labour.

Her Farewell Letter
Her farewell letter (often called 'moral will') was a letter written on 13 November 1941 to her friend Mme Balasse de Guide; collected in Pierre Seghers' Anthologie de la Résistance:

My friend,

You are the one among all whom I have chosen to receive my last wishes. I know that you love me enough to make them be respected by everyone. You will be told that I died needlessly, foolishly, like a fanatic. It will be the truth … factually, as far as it goes. There will be another truth. I perished to witness to the fact that one can at the same time love life and acquiesce to a necessary death.

Yours will be the task of softening my mother's pain. Tell her that I have fallen so that the skies of Belgium may be purer, so that those who follow me may live as freely as I myself have so much desired, that despite everything I have no regrets. As I write you, I calmly await the orders that will be given to me. What will they be? I don't know, and that is why I write you the farewell that my death must deliver you. It is to those like you that it is entirely dedicated, those who will be enabled to be reborn and to rebuild. And I think of your children who will be free tomorrow. Farewell.

Death
Marguerite Bervoets died on 7 August 1944 in Wolfenbüttel prison. Detournay was liberated by US forces on 24 April 1945.

Recognition
 In honor of Marguerite Bervoets, the Lycée de Mons, where she had her last three years of humanities and where her mother was director, bears her name; today it is the Athénée Royal Marguerite Bervoets.
 On 17 November 1946, an  inaugurated in the courtyard of the École Moyenne de la rue de Bouvy in La Louvière, a monument dedicated to Marguerite Bervoets and Laurette Demaret, former students of this establishment.
 A street of Mons also bears her name, as well as a street of Forest, (in Brussels) and even a street of Guyancourt (near Paris).
 There are many monuments that pay tribute to her, both in Belgium (especially in La Louvière thanks to a monument and a commemorative plaque), and abroad (for example on the shores of Lake Como ).
 The 151st promotion of Social and Military Sciences at the Royal Military Academy was sponsored by Marguerite Bervoets.
 At the school she taught at, a plaque in tribute to Marguerite Bervoets is installed in the entrance.
 A street in Forest bears her name

Bibliography
 Marguerite Bervoets, A Heroine, 1914–1944, L. Balasse-De Guide, The Renaissance of the Book, Brussels, 1958
 Marguerite Bervoets, E. Pequet, coll. The Notebooks of the Memory, HCD, 2014.

References

1914 births
1944 deaths
Resistance members killed by Nazi Germany
Belgian resistance members
People from Tournai
20th-century Belgian educators
Women in World War II